Volkenschwand is a municipality in the district of Kelheim in Bavaria in Germany.

References

Kelheim (district)